In the doubles event at the 2009 Internationaux de Strasbourg women's tennis tournament played in Strasbourg, France, the winning pair was Nathalie Dechy of France and Mara Santangelo of Italy.

Seeds

Draw

External links
Draw

Internationaux de Strasbourg - Doubles
Internationaux de Strasbourg
2009 in French tennis